Ryan Rhodes (born 20 November 1976) is a British former professional boxer who competed from 1995 to 2012. He held the British super welterweight title twice, from 1996 to 1997 and in 2008, and the EBU European super welterweight title from 2009 to 2010. Additionally he challenged for the WBO middleweight title in 1997, and the WBC super welterweight title in 2011.

Professional career
Rhodes took up boxing at a young age, training at Brendan Ingle's gym in the Wincobank district of Sheffield. At the age of 20, he defeated another Sheffield boxer Paul "Silky" Jones with a technical knock out in the eighth round to become the youngest post-war holder of the British title. He went on to win the belt outright in a record time of 90 days with wins over Peter Waudby and Del Bryan.

On 13 December 1997, Rhodes stepped up a weight division to middleweight to challenge the Canadian Otis Grant for the vacant WBO title but was defeated by a unanimous decision.

On 18 April 2008, Rhodes knocked out Gary Woolcombe 37 seconds into the 9th round to regain the British light middleweight title, 11 years after he first won it. He defended his title for the first time as the main event on the Hayemaker Promotions boxing show in Sheffield. His opponent was Jamie Coyle, whom he defeated by a unanimous decision.

Since then he has defeated Vincent Vuma of South Africa to win the WBC International light middleweight title and in doing so obtained a ranking in the top ten in the world.

Rhodes was due to defend his British light middleweight title against the Londoner Anthony Small at the Echo Arena in Liverpool on 28 March 2008, but withdrew because of an illness during his training camp.

He defeated Jamie Moore in the seventh round of their European title fight on 23 October 2009. He defended the title again on 21 May 2010 at home against the Italian Luca Messi, with a technical knock out in the sixth round.

Rhodes lost his WBC light middleweight challenge bout against Canelo Álvarez with a technical knockout in the twelfth round on 18 June 2011 in Guadalajara, Mexico.

Rhodes announced his retirement from professional boxing on 4 September 2012.

Professional boxing record

References

External links

1976 births
Living people
Sportspeople from Sheffield
English male boxers
European Boxing Union champions
Light-middleweight boxers
Middleweight boxers
Southpaw boxers
British Boxing Board of Control champions